Mantsi may refer to:

Mantsi language, a Sino-Tibetan language of China and northern Vietnam
Mantsi language (Nigeria), a Chadic language of northern Nigeria
Mantsinsaari Island of Karelia, Russia